The Lambeth Choirbook – also known as the Arundel Choirbook – is an illuminated choirbook dating to the sixteenth century.   It contains music for 7 Masses, 4 Magnificats, and 8 motets.  Much of the music is by Tudor-period composers.  The major contributors are Robert Fayrfax and Nicholas Ludford; between them they contributed at least ten of its nineteen pieces.  Only three of Fayrfax's works have his name attached to them, but five other pieces are known as his; these, along with two by Ludford, are known from concordances in the Caius Choirbook and other manuscripts.  Seven anonymous pieces exist in the book:
Ave Dei Patris filia
Ave mundi spes Maria
Gaude flore virginali
Salve regina
two Magnificats
Vidi aquam egredientem de templo (antiphon at the Aspersion before Mass during Eastertide).

No concordances for any of these have been traced, and it seems possible that further works by Fayrfax and Ludford might exist among them.  The book also contains music by older composers, such as Edmund Stourton and Walter Lambe, whose music may also be found in the Eton Choirbook.

The book is now housed in Lambeth Palace Library under the reference MS 1.

Sources 
HOASM.org

Bibliography
Skinner, David: The Arundel Choirbook (London, Lambeth Palace Library, MS 1): a Facsimile and Introduction (London: Roxburghe Club, 2003)
Curtis, Gareth; Wathey, Andrew: "Fifteenth-Century English Liturgical Music: A List of the Surviving Repertory" Royal Musical Association Research Chronicle, 27 (1994), 1–69
Benham, Hugh: Latin Church Music in England c.1460–1575 (London, 1977), 22–24, passim
Chew, Geoffrey: "The Provenance and Date of the Caius and Lambeth Choir-Books", Music and Letters, 51 (1970), 107–17
Bray, Roger W: The Interpretation of Musica Ficta in English Music, c.1490–c.1580, Unpublished Ph.D. dissertation, Oxford University (1969), I, 115ff; II, 43-68
Warren, Edwin B.: Life and Works of Robert Fayrfax, Musicological Studies and Documents vol. 22 (American Institute of Musicology, 1969), 42, 59–60, passim
Kirsch, Winfried: Die Quellen der mehrstimmigen Magnificat- und Te Deum-Vertonungen bis zur Mitte des 16. Jahrhunderts (Tutzing, 1966), 145
Todd, Henry J: A Catalogue of the Archiépiscopal Manuscripts in the Library at Lambeth Palace. London, 1812 (London, 1965), 1
Bergsagel, John D. (ed.): Nicholas Ludford (c.1485–c.1557): Collected Works, Corpus mensurabilis musicae vol. 27 (Neuhausen nr. Stuttgart: American Institute of Musicology, 1963–), Il, xiv–xv, 1–38, 130–79
Harrison, Frank Ll. (ed.): Early English Church Music (London: Stainer & Bell, 1963–), 4, 1–48, 130–31
Harrison, Frank Ll.: Music in Medieval Britain (London, 1963), 263–69, 307, 329–30, 335
Warren, Edwin B. (ed.): Robert Fayrfax (ca. 1464-1521): Collected Works, Corpus mensurabilis musicae Vol. 17 (Neuhausen nr. Stuttgart: American Institute of Musicology, 1959–66), I–II
Lyon, Margaret Elizabeth: Early Tudor Church Music: The Lambeth and Caius Manuscripts, Unpublished Ph.D. dissertation, University of California at Berkeley (1957), I–II
Westrup, J. A., et al. (eds.): New Oxford History of Music (London, New York, and Toronto, 1954–), 3, 308, 321ff
Blume, Friedrich (ed.): Die Musik in Geschichte und Gegenwart: Allgemeine Enzyklopädie der Musik (Kassel, 1949–79) [cited by volume and column number], 2, 1347; 6, 378; 8, 1173
James, Montague Rhodes; Jenkins, Claude: A Descriptive Catalogue of the Manuscripts in the Library of Lambeth Palace (Cambridge, 1930–32), 1
Collins, H. B.: "Latin Church Music by Early English Composers", Proceedings of the Royal Musical Association 39 (1912–13), 55–83; 43 (1916–17), 97–121 (XLIII), at 98–101, 104–6
Frere, Walter Howard: Bibliotheca Musico-Liturgica: A Descriptive Handlist of the Musical and Latin-Liturgical Mss. of the Middle Ages Preserved in the Libraries of Great Britain and Ireland (London, 1894–1932; reprint Hildesheim, 1967), 1, 4

External links
Free access to high-resolution images of this manuscript from Digital Image Archive of Medieval Music
Playlist of available works from the Lambeth Choirbook on Spotify
Lambeth Palace Library Catalogue entry for the Arundel Choirbook
Digital Image Archive of Medieval Music

16th-century books
16th-century illuminated manuscripts
Music illuminated manuscripts
Renaissance music
Books on English music
Renaissance music manuscript sources